Penicillium sphaerum is a species of fungus in the genus Penicillium which was isolated from wood in Panama.

References 

sphaerum
Fungi described in 1980